Diana Blok (born 1952) is a Uruguay-born Dutch photographer. 

Her work is included in the collections of the Stedelijk Museum Amsterdam, the Centre Pompidou, Paris, the Museo Nacional de Bellas Artes, Buenos Aires, and the Museum of Fine Arts Houston.

References

Living people
1952 births
20th-century Dutch photographers
21st-century Dutch photographers
20th-century Dutch women artists
21st-century Dutch women artists